Thomas Joseph Martins (born December 7, 1986) is an American professional stock car racing driver. He competes part-time in the NASCAR Xfinity Series, driving the No. 45 Chevrolet Camaro for Alpha Prime Racing.

Racing career

Martins began his racing career at the age of five in karting in his native Mississippi. After financial issues caused him to have to quit racing at 16, he attended the University of Mississippi seeking a degree in journalism. During his sophomore year, he resumed competition, driving in Sports Car Club of America-sanctioned events.

Choosing to pursue a racing career, Martins joined Nashville-based Baker Curb Racing, then moved to family-owned Martins Motorsports to compete in the NASCAR Camping World Truck Series, running five races between 2009 and 2011. He had one truck and an old engine from Roush Racing. After moving to the ARCA Racing Series on a limited basis, Martins returned to NASCAR in 2014, and planned to run the full Nationwide Series schedule. However, the plans fell apart, and Martins did not race in 2015. In 2016, Martins purchased the owners points of Billy Boat Motorsports' No. 15 truck with plans to run the full 2016 Truck schedule.

Martins ran his own No. 44 truck for the duration of the 2016 season. He ran 20 races, failed to qualify at Homestead-Miami Speedway and recorded a best finish of 15th at Michigan International Speedway; however, he missed the Alpha Energy Solutions 200 at Martinsville Speedway after wrecking his truck in qualifying and his spot on the grid was taken by Austin Wayne Self. He also maintained a blog throughout the 2016 season chronicling his journey that gained notoriety within the NASCAR community. His largest blog post was about how the financial situation in NASCAR needed to change.

For 2017, Martins paired up with another family team, Brandonbilt Motorsports, to split the 2017 schedule in the 44 truck. At Daytona International Speedway, Martins was hired to drive the No. 99 Chevrolet for MDM Motorsports, where an early crash relegated him to last in the 32-truck field. Martins would be in the No. 44 truck next week, finishing 23rd at Atlanta. On April 14, 2017, it was announced that Martins would return to the Xfinity Series, bringing his family team to compete for nine races in the No. 45 Chevy. Despite initially planning to begin his schedule at Bristol Motor Speedway, the team withdrew from the weekend due to concern about rain canceling qualifying and preventing the team from attempting to make the race. Martins stepped away from the Truck team to focus on Xfinity and later moved to B. J. McLeod Motorsports to run a partial Xfinity schedule.

After running Martins Motorsports in collaboration with AM Racing and Faith Motorsports in 2017, Martins closed his Truck team and announced another partial Xfinity schedule with McLeod in 2018. He ran over half the schedule with McLeod in 2018, continuing to bring awareness to the performance divide that underfunded teams face; he compared the Xfinity Series to a sports car race with different classes of cars, with Cup-affiliated teams as prototypes and small teams like BJMM in the Grand Touring division.

With Vinnie Miller joining B. J. McLeod Motorsports for 2019 full-time, Martins said he will likely run fewer races than he did in 2018 for the team. At New Hampshire Motor Speedway in July, Martins announced that he would leave BJMM for MBM Motorsports after the New Hampshire race for a partial slate in the back half of the 2019 Xfinity Series season. He estimated his MBM schedule at about six races, including all four road course races, Bristol Motor Speedway, and Texas Motor Speedway. Citing more opportunities in the Xfinity Series and a chance to run in the Monster Energy NASCAR Cup Series with MBM, Martins implied that he held no ill feelings toward McLeod and instead thanked the team for the opportunities throughout his tenure with the team. He ran his first race for MBM at Watkins Glen International, driving the No. 66. On December 8, Martins announced he parted ways with MBM Motorsports. Later in the month on December 24, Martins revealed Martins Motorsports' return for the 2020 Xfinity season as he intended to commit to a full-time schedule.

After a slew of issues in the first half of the 2021 season, Martins claimed his first career Xfinity Series top-ten at Texas Motor Speedway in October. On August 30, Martins confirmed a partnership with Caesar Bacarella to co-own Alpha Prime Racing, with Martins switching to a part-time schedule in 2022 to split the No. 44 with multiple drivers.

Motorsports career results

NASCAR
(key) (Bold – Pole position awarded by qualifying time. Italics – Pole position earned by points standings or practice time. * – Most laps led.)

Xfinity Series

Camping World Truck Series

ARCA Racing Series
(key) (Bold – Pole position awarded by qualifying time. Italics – Pole position earned by points standings or practice time. * – Most laps led.)

 Season still in progress
 Ineligible for series points
 Martins started the 2017 season running for Truck Series points, but switched to the Xfinity Series starting at Richmond in April.

References

External links

 
 

Living people
1986 births
People from Como, Mississippi
Racing drivers from Mississippi
NASCAR drivers
University of Mississippi alumni
ARCA Menards Series drivers